Chrysolaena is a genus of flowering plants belonging to the family Asteraceae.

Its native range is Peru to Brazil and Northern Argentina.

Species:

Chrysolaena campestris 
Chrysolaena candelabrum 
Chrysolaena cognata 
Chrysolaena cordifolia 
Chrysolaena cristobaliana 
Chrysolaena desertorum 
Chrysolaena dusenii 
Chrysolaena flexuosa 
Chrysolaena guaranitica 
Chrysolaena lithospermifolia 
Chrysolaena nicolackii 
Chrysolaena obovata 
Chrysolaena oligophylla 
Chrysolaena platensis 
Chrysolaena propinqua 
Chrysolaena sceptrum 
Chrysolaena simplex 
Chrysolaena verbascifolia

References

Asteraceae
Asteraceae genera